Hydroxyepiandrosterone may refer to:

 7α-Hydroxyepiandrosterone
 7β-Hydroxyepiandrosterone